José Joel González Sandoval (born 27 January 1979) is a Mexican former footballer.,

He started his career with Irapuato and then moved to Atlante, going on to make 112 Primera Division de Mexico appearances for them between 2002 and 2004. He then made over 60 appearances for Monterrey before returning to Atlante for the Primera División de México Clausura 2007 season. Gonzalez stayed for the Clausura and following Apertura seasons and then moved back to Monterrey where he played another 30 Primera matches. After a short spell with Necaxa he returned to Atlante for a third time.

International Caps 

As of 16 April 2008

Honours
Atlante
Apertura 2007

References

1979 births
Living people
Footballers from Mexico City
Irapuato F.C. footballers
Atlante F.C. footballers
C.F. Monterrey players
Club Necaxa footballers
Club Puebla players
San Luis F.C. players
Mexican footballers
Association football midfielders